Abbagnale is an Italian surname. Notable people with the surname include:

Agostino Abbagnale (born 1966), Italian rower
Carmine Abbagnale (born 1962), Italian rower
Giuseppe Abbagnale (born 1959), Italian rower
Vincenzo Abbagnale (born 1993), Italian rower

See also
Abagnale

Italian-language surnames